The 96th National Guard Higher Command (96 Anoteri Dioikisi Tagmaton Ethnofylakis, 96 ADTE), is a Hellenic Army mechanized infantry brigade  responsible for the defence of the island of Chios, Greece.

Structure 
  96th National Guard Higher Command (96η ΑΔΤΕ), based at Chios
 HQ Company (ΛΣΤ/96 ΑΔΤΕ)
 96th National Guard Armored Battalion (96 ΕΑΡΜΕΘ)
 147th National Guard Battalion (147 ΤΕ)
 96th National Guard Battalion (96 ΤΕ)
 228th National Guard Mechanized Battalion (228 M/K ΤΕ)
 297th National Guard Mechanized Battalion (297 M/K ΤΕ)
 643rd National Guard Battalion (643 ΤΕ)
 96th National Guard Artillery Battalion (96 ΜΕΘ)
 96th National Guard Medical Battalion (96 ΤΥΕΘ)
 96th National Guard Engineer Battalion (96 ΤΜΧΕΘ)
 96th National Guard Anti Τank Company (96 ΛΑΤΕΘ)
 96th National Guard Signal Company (96 ΛΔΒΕΘ)
 96th National Guard Support Battalion (96 ΤΥΠΕΘ)
 Chios Home Guard Battalion (ΤΕ Χίου)
 Vrontados Home Guard Battalion (ΤΕ Βροντάδου)

References

Mechanized infantry brigades of Greece
Chios